The boroughs of Amsterdam (literally "city parts")  are the eight principal subdivisions of the municipality of Amsterdam, Netherlands. Each borough is governed by a directly elected district committee (bestuurscommissie). The first Amsterdam boroughs were created in 1981, with other boroughs created in later years. The last area to be granted the status of borough was Amsterdam-Centrum (2002). The existing system of eight boroughs, covering all parts of Amsterdam, is the result of a major borough reform in 2010. The current boroughs have populations of around 80,000 to 150,000, which is equivalent to an average-sized municipality in the Netherlands.

Borough government
 

Until 2014, the Amsterdam boroughs had the status of submunicipalities (deelgemeenten), a form of government which existed only in Amsterdam and Rotterdam. The borough of Westpoort, however, was governed by the central municipal authorities and therefore not a submunicipality. The submunicipalities were recognised under the Dutch Municipalities Act and enjoyed far-going autonomy, with the central municipal authorities abiding to the "submunicipalities decide, unless" principle. The submunicipalities were governed by a directly elected district council (deelraad) as well as a separate district executive board, the members of which were appointed and controlled by the council. The central municipal authorities retained some power, especially in the areas of public order (police), budget, public transport and social security.

In 2013, the States General of the Netherlands adopted a revision of the Municipalities Act abolishing submunicipalities as a form of government. Since the 2014 municipal elections, therefore, the Amsterdam district councils have ceased to exist. Under a municipal ordinance, however, they were replaced by smaller, but still directly elected district committees (bestuurscommissies). All Dutch nationals, all EU nationals, as well as non-EU nationals who have lived in the Netherlands for at least three consecutive years, are eligible to vote for the district committee of the Amsterdam borough in which they live according to the city's civil register. Each district committee elects three of its members to form an executive committee (dagelijks bestuur).

The district committees' jurisdiction is determined by the central municipal council. Responsibilities delegated to the 2018-2022 district committees include parks and recreation, streets and squares, refuse collection, permits and events, preparation of zoning plans, passports and drivers licenses, and welfare work. As the new district committees depend on powers being delegated by the central municipal council, their position is far less autonomous than their predecessors. Instead, the district committees are considered to be the local 'eyes and ears' of the central municipal authorities, carrying out their delegated powers within the frameworks determined by the municipal council and the college van burgemeester en wethouders.

List of boroughs
Since 2010, there are eight boroughs.

References

 
Government of Amsterdam
Geography of Amsterdam
Dutch political institutions
Local government in the Netherlands